Rivare is an unincorporated community in St. Marys Township, Adams County, in the U.S. state of Indiana.

History
Rivare was named for Antoine Rivare, a Native American settler.

Geography

References

Unincorporated communities in Adams County, Indiana
Unincorporated communities in Indiana